The 2008 Nordic Trophy was the third Nordic Trophy ice hockey tournament, played between August 7 and September 6, 2008. The final weekend was played in Cloetta Center and Stångebro Arena.

Standings

Game log 

|-
|rowspan="5"|Thursday, August 7||Jokerit||2–3||HV71||Varkaus||952
|-
|Kärpät||2–0||Färjestad||Oulu||6014
|-
|Tappara||4–7||Linköping||Lempäälä||437
|-
|TPS||4–1||Frölunda||Turku||2015
|-
|HIFK||3–2||Djurgården||Järvenpää||920
|-
|rowspan="5"|Friday, August 8||Kärpät||2–0||HV71||Oulu||2741
|-
|TPS||4–3 GWS||Färjestad||Loimma||554
|-
|Jokerit||2–4||Linköping||Varkaus||872
|-
|HIFK||0–1||Frölunda||Järvenpää||1015
|-
|Tappara||4–2||Djurgården||Tampere||2357
|-
|rowspan="5"|Sunday, August 10||Tappara||5–4||HV71||Kangasala||490
|-
|Jokerit||3–4||Färjestad||Joensuu||2343
|-
|HIFK||0–3||Linköping||Tikkurila||1860
|-
|Kärpät||1–3||Frölunda||Oulu||2562
|-
|TPS||2–6||Djurgården||Paimio||355
|-
|rowspan="2"|Thursday, August 14||TPS||2–7||HIFK||?||?
|-
|Linköping||4–1||Djurgården||?||?
|-
|Friday, August 15||Färjestad||1–3||Frölunda||?||?
|-
|rowspan="3"|Tuesday, August 19||Jokerit||5–3||Tappara||?||?
|-
|Kärpät||4–1||TPS||?||?
|-
|Linköping||3–2||Färjestad||?||?
|-
|rowspan="5"|Thursday, August 21||Linköping||2–3||TPS||?||?
|-
|HV71||3–5||HIFK||?||?
|-
|Färjestad||2–1||Tappara||?||?
|-
|Frölunda||5–3||Jokerit||?||?
|-
|Djurgården||5–2||Kärpät||?||?
|-
|rowspan="5"|Friday, August 22||Linköping||?||Kärpät||?||?
|-
|HV71||?||TPS||?||?
|-
|Färjestad||?||HIFK||?||?
|-
|Frölunda||?||Tappara||?||?
|-
|Djurgården||4–2||Jokerit||Hovet||625
|-
|Sunday, August 24||HV71||1–2||Djurgården||Kinnarps Arena||4700
|-
|rowspan="4"|Tuesday, August 26||HIFK||?||Tappara||?||?
|-
|Kärpät||?||Jokerit||?||?
|-
|HV71||?||Linköping||?||?
|-
|Djurgården||6–2||Frölunda||Vallentuna Ishall||1619
|-
|rowspan="2"|Thursday, August 28||Tappara||?||Kärpät||?||?
|-
|TPS||?||Jokerit||?||?
|-
|rowspan="3"|Friday, August 29||HIFK||?||Kärpät||?||?
|-
|Djurgården||5–3||Färjestad||Jordal Amfi||2172
|-
|Frölunda||?||HV71||?||?
|-
|rowspan="4"|Tuesday, September 2||Jokerit||?||HIFK||?||?
|-
|Tappara||?||TPS||?||?
|-
|Färjestad||?||HV71||?||?
|-
|Frölunda||?||Linköping||?||?
|-

External links 
www.nordictrophy.com/ — Official site

Nordic Trophy
Nordic
Nor